Wiscoal is an unincorporated community in Knott County, Kentucky, United States.

History
The community was named for the Wisconsin Coal Company, which operated a mine and offices there.

References

Unincorporated communities in Knott County, Kentucky
Unincorporated communities in Kentucky
Coal towns in Kentucky